Holcodiscus is an extinct ammonite genus placed in the family Holcodiscidae. Species in this genus were fast-moving nektonic carnivores. The type species of the genus is Ammonites caillaudianus.

Description 
Circular to rectangular whorl section; fine, low, straight or flexuous simple or branched ribs, periodically truncated by thin, high, enlarged ribs bearing lateral and ventrolateral tubercles; inner whorls tending to have depressed whorl section and to resemble Olcostephanus.

Species  
 Holcodiscus caillaudianus d'Orbigny 1850
 Holcodiscus camelinus d'Orbigny 1850
 Holcodiscus hauthali Paulcke 1907
 Holcodiscus tenuistriatus Paulcke 1907

Distribution 
Fossils of species within this genus have been found in the Cretaceous sediments of Austria, Bulgaria, Chile, Colombia, Czech Republic, Slovakia, France, Italy, Morocco, Spain and Russia.

Gallery

Notes

References 
 Arkell, W.J. et al., (1957). Mesozoic Ammonoidea   Treatise on Invertebrate Paleontology, Part L, Ammonoidea. Geological Society of America and Univ Kansas Press.

External links 

 
 

Cretaceous ammonites
Ammonitida genera
Desmoceratoidea
Ammonites of Europe
Early Cretaceous genus first appearances
Santonian genus extinctions
Barremian life
Hauterivian life
Cretaceous Italy
Fossils of Italy
Cretaceous France
Fossils of France
Fossils of Georgia (country)
Cretaceous Spain
Fossils of Spain
Ammonites of North America
Fossils of the United States
Ammonites of South America
Cretaceous Argentina
Fossils of Argentina
Cretaceous Colombia
Fossils of Colombia